Tel Motza or Tel Moẓa is an archaeological site in Motza, on the outskirts of Jerusalem. It includes the remains of a large Neolithic settlement dated to around 8600–8200 BCE, and Iron Age Israelite settlement dating to around 1000 to 500 BCE and identified with the biblical Mozah mentioned in the Book of Joshua. In 2012, Israeli archaeologists announced the discovery of a temple from the Iron Age IIA levels at Motza, contemporary with the First Temple in Jerusalem.

Neolithic
A 9,000-year-old Neolithic site was discovered at Motza.

Archaeologists found at Tel Motza remains of a settlement dated to the Neolithic period (about 6000 BCE), indicating that Motza was part of an ancient economic center. The site was called "Big Bang" of Prehistory because of the preservation of the artefacts and the size of its area. It has been discovered that the area was home to about 3,000 residents. This Neolithic settlement is considered the largest ever discovered in Israel, and changed the beliefs about this area being uninhabited during that period. "This is most probably the largest excavation of this time period in the Middle East, which will allow the research to advance leaps and bounds ahead of where we are today, just by the amount of material that we are able to save and preserve from this site", reported archaeologist Lauren Davis from the IAA.

Excavations at Tel Motza took place in 2012–13 and 2019. The area was excavated by the Israel Antiquities Authority (IAA) because of the highway construction, and the researches are conducted by IAA archaeologists Hamoudi Khalaily and Jacob Vardi.

Flint tools (arrowheads, axes, blades and knives), figurine of an ox made of clay, a stone-carved human face, seeds, stone bracelets, animal bones  and other objects have been found from the site. According to the archaeologists, "Amongst others, unique stone-made objects were found in the tombs, made of an unknown type of stone, as well as items made of obsidian (volcanic glass) from Anatolia, and sea-shells, some of which were brought from the Mediterranean Sea and some from the Red Sea."

Tel Motza: Iron Age temple
Excavations in Motza (2012) unearthed the Tel Motza temple, a large building revealing clear elements of ritual use, dated to the 9th century BCE. A rare cache of ritual objects found near the building included tiny ceramic figurines of men and animals. An analysis of animal bones found at the site indicated that they belonged only to kosher animals. Excavations at the site continued as late as 2013, led by archaeologists Shua Kisilevitz, Zvi Greenhut, and Anna Eirikh-Rose on behalf of the Israel Antiquities Authority (IAA). Some finds, such as the possible presence of a Canaanite storm god, have been interpreted as further evidence that First Temple era Judahite religion ("Yahwism") was markedly different from the monotheistic Judaism depicted much later in the Bible.

Excavations at Tel Motza carried out prior to construction on Highway 1 revealed a public building, storehouses and silos dating to the days of the monarchic period (Iron Age IIA). A wide, east-facing entrance in the wall of the public building is believed to have been built in accordance with temple construction traditions in the Ancient Near East: the sun rising in the east would illuminate an object placed inside the temple, symbolizing the divine presence.

An array of sacred pottery vessels, chalices and small figurines of men and horses were found near the altar of the temple. The cache of sacred vessels has been dated to the early 9th century BCE, that is before the centralizing religious reforms of Kings Hezekiah (reign ca. 729–687 BCE) and Josiah (reign ca. 640–609 BCE) of Judah.

The temple dates back to the Kingdom of Judah of the 9th century BCE, and appears to have operated alongside the First Temple in nearby Jerusalem. Jerusalem was the centre of the Kingdom of Judah and, according to the Hebrew Bible, the seat of kings David and Solomon. Many historical finds have been discovered in the area of Tel Motza, dating from different periods, and archaeologists have sought to identify it as the Biblical settlement of Mozah mentioned in the Book of Joshua.

The archaeological site directors said the discoveries provided evidence for the existence of temples and ritual enclosures throughout the Kingdom of Judah before the religious reforms centralized ritual practices at the Temple in Jerusalem. The temple was a rare find of remains from the First Temple period.

Animal bones were found at the site, and show signs of having been cut, possibly indicating that they were sacrificed.

Neolithic findings in temple area
Occupation earth with one of the first remains of buildings, statuettes and bones of domesticated animals in the temple's area and nearby goes back to about 7,000 BC. This older part is to be buried by Jerusalem Road 16 in 2019 after development-led excavation.

See also
 Archaeology of Israel
 City of David (historic)
 En Esur, Chalcolithic-period settlement of comparable size to Neolithic Motza
 Tabernacle
 Temple Mount

References

External links
 Temple and rare cache of sacred vessels from Biblical times discovered at Tel Motza Israel Antiquities Authority December 2012 
  Temple and sacred vessels from Biblical times discovered at Tel Motza Ministry of Foreign Affairs 26 December 2012. Republication of the IAA article but with an aerial view of the site instead of a general view  

8th-century BC religious buildings and structures
Establishments in the Kingdom of Judah
Religion in ancient Israel and Judah
Tabernacle and Temples in Jerusalem
2012 archaeological discoveries
Destroyed temples